Taxodiaceae is a formerly recognized coniferous plant family comprising the following ten genera: 

Athrotaxis
Cryptomeria
Cunninghamia
†Cunninghamites
Glyptostrobus
Metasequoia
Sciadopitys
Sequoia
Sequoiadendron
†Sequoioxylon
Taiwania
Taxodium

However, research has shown that the Taxodiaceae genera, with the exception of Sciadopitys, are phylogenetically part of the family Cupressaceae. There are no consistent characters by which they can be separated, and genetic evidence demonstrates close relationships.

The one exception, the genus Sciadopitys, is genetically very distinct from all other conifers, and now treated in a family of its own, Sciadopityaceae.

As proposed, genera of the former Taxodiaceae are grouped in the following subfamilies within the larger Cupressaceae:

 Athrotaxidoideae Quinn (Athrotaxis)
 Cunninghamioideae (Sieb. & Zucc.) Quinn (Cunninghamia)
 Sequoioideae (Luerss.) Quinn (Sequoia, Sequoiadendron, and Metasequoia)
 Taiwanioideae (Hayata) Quinn (Taiwania)
 Taxodioideae Endl. ex K. Koch (Taxodium, Glyptostrobus, and Cryptomeria)

Evolution

In earth's history Taxodiaceae were widespread. They are known since the Jurassic and can be found as fossil from Tertiary times.

See also
Taxodioideae

External links
 Gymnosperm Database - Cupressaceae
 Gymnosperm Database - Sciadopityaceae

Cupressaceae
Pinales families
Historically recognized plant families